Lola Haskins is an American poet.

Life
She was born in New York, and raised in northern California. Haskins has lived in San Francisco, Greece, and Mexico.  She now divides her time between Northern England and North-Central Florida.

She has published fourteen books—the outliers being a poetry advice book, an exploration of fifteen Florida cemeteries, and a book of prose-poem fables about women, illustrated by Maggie Taylor.

Her work has appeared in The Atlantic, Beloit Poetry Journal, The Christian Science Monitor, Prairie Schooner, The Missouri Review, Mississippi Review, The London Review of Books, Georgia Review, Southern Review.

She taught computer science at the University of Florida for 28 years. Then, from 2004 until 2015, she was on the faculty of the Rainier Writer's Workshop, a low res MFA program based at Pacific Lutheran University.

Awards
 two fellowships from the National Endowment for the Arts 
 four individual artist fellowships from the state of Florida
 1992 Iowa Poetry Prize, for Hunger
 Florida Book awards for Still, the Mountain and The Grace to Leave
 Writer Magazine/Emily Dickinson Award from the Poetry Society of America

Works
"Grandmother Speaks of the Old Country", Poetry Foundation
"To Play Pianissimo", Poetry Foundation
"from CASTINGS"; "from ACROSS HER BROAD LAP SOMETHING WONDERFUL"; "from FORTY-FOUR AMBITIONS FOR THE PIANO"; "from HUNGER"; "from THE RIM BENDERS", Adrondack Review, Fall 2005
"Love Story", The Scream
"Untitled"; "The Interpreters"; "Five from the Lake", Good Times Santa Cruz
 How Small, Confronting Morning, Jacar, 2016.
 The Grace to Leave,  publisher=Anhinga year=2012  url=http://anhinga.org/books/book_info.cfm?title=Grace%20to%20Leave
 Fifteen Florida Cemeteries, Strange Tales Unearthed, publisher=University Press of Florida  year=2011
 Still the Mountain publisher=Paper Kite Press year=2010  url=http://www.paperkitepress.com/shop.shtml
 
 
 
 
 
 
 
 Across Her Broad Lap Something Wonderful, State Street, 1990

Prose
 
 
 Fifteen Florida Cemeteries: Strange Tales Unearthed, University Press of Florida, 2011

Anthologies

Ploughshares
"Uchepas", Ploughshares, Winter 1993-94 
"Grass", Ploughshares, Spring 2002

References

External links
"Author's website
"Lola Haskins", Fishouse
"Lola Haskins", 3rd Muse

Year of birth missing (living people)
Living people
American women poets
Analog Science Fiction and Fact people
Pacific Lutheran University faculty
American women academics
21st-century American women